Hatfield Motor Company may refer to:
 Hatfield Motor Vehicle Company
 Cortland Cart & Carriage Company that produced cars between 1912-1924 under Hatfield brand.